Frans-H. van den Dungen (1898–1965) was a Belgian scientist and professor at the Universite Libre de Bruxelles. In 1946 he was awarded the Francqui Prize on Exact Sciences.

Among his students was the mathematician Paul Dedecker.

External links

 Universite Libre de Bruxelles (History of Science Department)

Academic staff of the Université libre de Bruxelles
Belgian mathematicians
1898 births
1965 deaths